Delta Upsilon Fraternity House may refer to:

Delta Upsilon Fraternity House (Champaign, Illinois), listed on the National Register of Historic Places in Champaign County, Illinois
Delta Upsilon Chapter House (Ames, Iowa), listed on the National Register of Historic Places in Story County, Iowa
Delta Upsilon Fraternity House (Ann Arbor, Michigan), listed on the National Register of Historic Places in Washtenaw County, Michigan
Delta Upsilon Fraternity House (London, Ontario), the location of Canada's Worst Handyman 5